Accra tanzanica is a species of moth of the family Tortricidae. It is found in Tanzania.

The wingspan is about 12 mm. The wing shape and colouration are as in Accra plumbeana, but the red pattern consists of broader elements and the distal portion of the forewings is pale ochreous yellow. There is also a small concolorous spot filled with grey black in the tornal area. The hindwings are blackish grey.

References

Endemic fauna of Tanzania
Moths described in 1990
Tortricini
Moths of Africa